Gianni Munari (born 24 June 1983) is an Italian football official and a former player who played as a midfielder. He works as a scout for Parma.

Career

From Sassuolo to Palermo
Munari started his career with hometown club Sassuolo, after being promoted to the senior squad from the youth team. He scored 2 goals in 49 appearances during his two-year spell with the club. In 2003, he joined Giulianova (via Chievo in co-ownership deal), where he would spend just one season, scoring three goals in 25 total appearances. He then joined Serie B side Triestina in 2004 in temporary deal with option to co-own the player. He had an impressive season, making 35 appearances and scoring 5 goals in his only season with the Trieste-based club. In June 2005 Triestina excised the option for €175,000. He was snapped up by another Serie B club on 30 August 2005 in the form of Verona, (which Verona bought Munari from Triestina for €350,000) where he managed to make 38 appearances and score 4 goals in one season. In June 2006 Verona acquired Munari outright from the cross-town rival for an undisclosed fee.

Following such an impressive spell in Verona, he was purchased by Serie A side U.S. Città di Palermo together with teammate Mattia Cassani. Half of the Munari's registration rights was valued €1 million while full "card" of Cassani was valued €2.5 million. However, Munari never managed to break into the first team at the Sicilian club and did not play at all during the first half of the 2006–07 Serie A season, being subsequently loaned out to Serie B side Lecce in January 2007. In June 2007 Palermo acquired another half of Munari for €800,000. However, in July 2007, Lecce acquired 50% of the player's rights from Palermo for €1 million; Munari then remained at Lecce for four more seasons, making a total of 143 appearances for the club, scoring 16 goals and becoming one of the first team mainstays.

From Fiorentina to Sampdoria
In June 2011, Munari's co-ownership was ultimately solved in favour of Palermo for €391,000, and the player returned to Palermo, but was immediately clarified he was not in the rosanero first team plans after he was not called up to join the Sicilians' pre-season training camp. On 21 July 2011, he moved permanently to Fiorentina for €800,000, signing a three-year contract for the Tuscans. On 31 January 2012, the final day of 2011–12 winter transfer window, he moved to Serie B side Sampdoria.

Loan to Watford
On 4 August 2014, Munari joined English Championship side Watford on a season-long loan deal from Parma.
He scored his first goal for Watford against Rotherham United on 19 August 2014 in a 2–0 away win for the Hornets.

Cagliari
After his loan at Watford expired, and after leaving Parma, Munari penned a one-year deal with Cagliari on 29 July 2015. His contract was extended in summer 2016.

Return to Parma
In January 2017, Munari was re-signed by Parma in a -year contract. On 14 November 2019, he announced his retirement from playing and that he joined the club's scouting department.

Loan to Verona
On 31 January 2019, Munari joined Verona on loan until 30 June 2019.

References

External links
Munari's profile (from US Palermo official website) 

Living people
1983 births
People from Sassuolo
Sportspeople from the Province of Modena
Italian footballers
Footballers from Emilia-Romagna
Association football midfielders
Serie A players
Serie B players
English Football League players
U.S. Sassuolo Calcio players
Giulianova Calcio players
Palermo F.C. players
U.S. Lecce players
U.S. Triestina Calcio 1918 players
ACF Fiorentina players
U.C. Sampdoria players
Parma Calcio 1913 players
Hellas Verona F.C. players
Watford F.C. players
Cagliari Calcio players
Italian expatriate footballers
Italian expatriate sportspeople in England
Expatriate footballers in England